Jacob Pavlovich Kogan (born May 28, 1995) is an American actor. He is perhaps best known for playing the title role in the 2007 psychological thriller Joshua and as the young Spock in J. J. Abrams' Star Trek.

Life and career
Kogan was born in New York City to author and photographer Deborah Copaken Kogan and Russian-born child actor Paul Kogan. Paul emigrated from Moscow, Russia (then in the Soviet Union). Kogan has two younger siblings; a sister, Sasha (born March 1997) and a brother, Leo (born May 2006). His mother's family were Jewish immigrants from Russia, Ukraine and Lithuania, and his father is a Russian-Jewish immigrant. He considers himself Jewish and an atheist.

He attended the Dalton School in New York City during which time he was the lead singer/guitarist in a band, Flake, which released a self-titled EP in 2008. 
Before starring in Joshua, Kogan was a regular on the comedy series, Wonder Showzen. He had a supporting role in Lifelines by writer/director Rob Margolies. The film was released on April 3, 2009 at the Quad Theater in Manhattan after being shown at film festivals in the previous year. He also had a supporting role in the television series Delocated as David. He guest-starred on Law & Order: Special Victims Unit in 2011 in the episode "Blood Brothers" as Tripp Raines. He also portrayed Luca Jameson in the science fiction series The Tomorrow People.

Filmography

Film

Television

References

External links

Jacob Kogan at MovieKids

1995 births
21st-century American male actors
American male child actors
American male film actors
American atheists
American people of Russian-Jewish descent
Dalton School alumni
Jewish American male actors
Jewish atheists
Living people
Male actors from New York (state)